The Canadian Parliamentary Poet Laureate is the national poet laureate of Canada. The current poet laureate is Marie-Célie Agnant.

The position is an office of the Library of Parliament.

Role
According to the laureate's official Web site: "The Poet's role is to encourage and promote the importance of literature, culture and language in Canadian society. Federal legislators created the position in 2001 to draw Canadians' attention to poetry, both spoken and written, and its role in our lives."

The Parliament of Canada Act states that the laureate may:

 Write poems "especially for use in Parliament on important occasions"
 Sponsor poetry readings 
 Give advice to "the Parliamentary Librarian regarding the Library's collection and acquisitions to enrich its cultural materials" 
 Do anything else: "perform other related duties at the request of the Speaker of the Senate, the Speaker of the House of Commons, or the Parliamentary Librarian."

The laureate serves at the pleasure of both the Speaker of the Senate and the Speaker of the House of Commons, with the maximum term of office set at two years.

The position comes with an annual stipend of $20,000, up to $13,000 in travel expenses annually, a budget for administrative expenses and translation/adaptation into Canada's second official language.

Selection criteria

In order to be chosen for the position, a poet must have: 
 contributed to the cultural and literary community 
 produced written or oral work reflecting Canada 
 be an accomplished literary artist who has influenced other artists 
 a substantial record demonstrating literary excellence

Poets Laureate
 George Bowering (2002–2004)
 Pauline Michel (2004–2006)
 John Steffler (2006–2008)
 Pierre DesRuisseaux (2009–2011)
 Fred Wah (2011–2013)
 Michel Pleau (2014–2016)
 George Elliott Clarke (2016–2017)
 Georgette LeBlanc (2018–2019)
 Louise Bernice Halfe (2021–2023)
 Marie-Célie Agnant (2023–present)

See also
Poet Laureate of Ontario

References

External links 

 
2001 establishments in Canada